Hopkinsia is a genus of plants in the family Restionaceae, first described as a genus in 1904. The entire group is endemic to southwestern Australia.

 Species
 Hopkinsia adscendens  B.G.Briggs & L.A.S.Johnson
 Hopkinsia anoectocolea (F.Muell.) D.F.Cutler

References

Poales genera
Restionaceae
Endemic flora of Western Australia